The Ministry of Domestic Trade and Cost of Living , abbreviated KPDN, is a ministry of the Government of Malaysia that is responsible for domestic trade, living costs, co-operatives, consumerism, franchise, companies, intellectual property, competition, controlled goods, price control, direct selling, consumer rights, trader.

Organisation 
 Minister of Domestic Trade and Cost of Living
 Under the Authority of Minister
 Competition Appeal Tribunal
 Deputy Minister of Domestic Trade and Cost of Living
 Secretary-General
 Under the Authority of Secretary-General
 Policy and Strategic Planning Division
 Legal Division
 Enforcement Division
 Corporate Communication Unit
 Petroleum Vehicles Subsidy Management Division
 Internal Audit Division
 Integrity Division
 Delivery Management Office 
 Key Performance Indicator Unit
 Ministry of Domestic Trade, Co-operatives and Consumerism State Offices
 Deputy Secretary-General (Domestic Trade)
 Franchise Development Division
 Domestic Trade Division
 Services Industry Division
 Business Development Division
 Co-operative Development Division
 Deputy Secretary-General (Consumerism and Management)
 Consumerism Movement Division
 Research and Policy Division
 Human Resources Division
 Administration Services and Finance Division
 Tribunal for Consumer Claims 
 Consumerism Standards Division
 Information Management Division
 Account Division

Federal agencies 
 Co-operative College of Malaysia, or Maktab Koperasi Malaysia (MKM). (Official site)
 Companies Commission of Malaysia, Suruhanjaya Syarikat Malaysia (SSM). (Official site)
 Malaysia Co-operative Societies Commission, or Suruhanjaya Koperasi Malaysia (SKM). (Official site )
 Malaysia Competition Commission (MyCC), or Suruhanjaya Persaingan Malaysia. (Official site)
 Intellectual Property Corporation of Malaysia (MyIPO), Perbadanan Harta Intelek Malaysia. (Official site)
 Perbadanan Nasional Berhad (PNS). (Official site)
 Bank Kerjasama Rakyat Malaysia Berhad (Bank Rakyat). (Official site)

Key legislation 
The Ministry of Domestic Trade and Cost of Living is responsible for administration of several key Acts:
Ministry of Domestic Trade and Cost of Living
 Weights and Measures Act 1972 [Act 71]
 Control of Supplies Act 1961 [Act 122]
 Petroleum Development Act 1974 [Act 144]
 Hire-Purchase Act 1967 [Act 212]
 Petroleum (Safety Measures) Act 1984 [Act 302]
 Exclusive Economic Zone Act 1984 [Act 311]
 Direct Sales and Anti-Pyramid Scheme Act 1993 [Act 500]
 Franchise Act 1998 [Act 590]
 Consumer Protection Act 1999 [Act 599]
 Optical Discs Act 2000 [Act 606]
 Electronic Commerce Act 2006 [Act 658]
 Price Control and Anti-Profiteering Act 2011 [Act 723]
 Trade Descriptions Act 2011 [Act 730]
Companies Commission of Malaysia
 Kootu Funds (Prohibition) Act 1971 [Act 28]
 Companies Act 1965 [Act 125]
 Registration of Businesses Act 1956 [Act 197]
 Companies Commission of Malaysia Act 2001 [Act 614]
 Langkawi International Yacht Registry Act 2003 [Act 630]
 Limited Liability Partnerships Act 2012 [Act 743]
Intellectual Property Corporation of Malaysia
 Trade Marks Act 1976 [Act 175]
 Patents Act 1983 [Act 291]
 Copyright Act 1987 [Act 332]
 Industrial Designs Act 1996 [Act 552]
 Layout-Designs of Integrated Circuits Act 2000 [Act 601]
 Geographical Indications Act 2000 [Act 602]
 Intellectual Property Corporation of Malaysia Act 2002 [Act 617]
Co-operative College of Malaysia
 Co-operative College (Incorporation) Act 1968 [Act 437]
Malaysia Co-operative Societies Commission
 Co-operative Societies Act 1993 [Act 502]
 Malaysia Co-operative Societies Commission Act 2007 [Act 665]
Bank Kerjasama Rakyat Malaysia Berhad
 Bank Kerjasama Rakyat Malaysia Berhad (Special Provisions) Act 1978 [Act 202]
Malaysia Competition Commission
 Competition Act 2010 [Act 712]
 Competition Commission Act 2010 [Act 713]

Policy Priorities of the Government of the Day 
 National Intellectual Property Policy
 Fair Trade Practices Policy
 National Consumer Policy
 National Co-operatives Policy

Programmes 
 1Malaysia Pengguna Bijak 
 Beli Barangan Buatan Malaysia
 1Malaysia 1Harga
 Friends of KPDNKK
 Antipencatutan
 Kedai Rakyat 1Malaysia
 Menu Rakyat 1Malaysia
 Pemasaran Produk Usahawan IKS di Pasar Raya

Legal Framework 
The Federal Constitution allows Parliament to make laws related to trade, commerce and industry that include:
 production, supply and distribution of goods; price control and food control; adulteration of foodstuffs and other goods;
 imports into, and exports from, the Federation;
 incorporation, regulation and winding up of corporations other than municipal corporations (but including the municipal corporation of the federal capital); regulation of foreign corporations; bounties on production in or export from the Federation;
 insurance, including compulsory insurance;
 patents; designs, inventions; trade marks and mercantile marks; copyrights;
 establishment of standards of weights and measures;
 establishment of standards of quality of goods manufactured in or exported from the Federation;
 auctions and auctioneers;
 industries; regulation of industrial undertakings;
 subject to item 2(c) in the State List: Development of mineral resources; mines, mining, minerals and mineral ores; oils and oilfields; purchase, sale, import and export of minerals and mineral ores; petroleum products; regulation of labour and safety in mines and oilfields;
 factories; boilers and machinery; dangerous trades; and
 dangerous and inflammable substances.

See also 
 Minister of Domestic Trade and Living Costs (Malaysia)

References

External links 

 Ministry of Domestic Trade and Living Costs
 

Federal ministries, departments and agencies of Malaysia
Malaysia
Malaysia
Ministries established in 2009
2009 establishments in Malaysia